Deborah Faye Russell (born 14 January 1966) is a New Zealand academic and politician. She is a Member of Parliament in the House of Representatives for the Labour Party.

Biography

Early life
Russell was born in Whangamōmona, a small town in the Manawatū-Whanganui region.

Academic career
Russell graduated with a BCom (Hon) in Accounting and Finance from University of Otago in 1987. This was followed by a BA (Hon) in Philosophy in 1996 from Massey University. In 2001 she received her PhD in Philosophy from Australian National University.

Russell worked in the private sector as an accountant, and in the public sector as a policy analyst. She has lectured at universities in both Australia and New Zealand in taxation, ethics, business ethics, political theory and philosophy. She was a senior lecturer specialising in taxation at Massey University.

Political career

Member of Parliament

First term, 2017–2020
In February 2017, after a competitive selection process, Russell was chosen as Labour's 2017 candidate for New Lynn. She replaced former Labour Party leader David Cunliffe, who had, in the previous year, signalled his intention to retire from politics at the next election. Russell promised to change her residence to the electorate if she was selected, and she now lives there. Russell was ranked 30 on Labour's party list, up three places from 2014. She won New Lynn with a margin of 2,825 votes over National's Paulo Garcia, and entered Parliament.

On 27 June 2019, Russell became Chair of the Finance and Expenditure Select Committee, replacing her previous role as Chair of the Environment Select Committee. Russell in November 2019 said she would like New Zealand to be "the most equal country in the world – full stop".

On 22 April 2020, Russell drew media attention and public criticism when she made remarks during a video conference with the Epidemic Response Committee suggesting that the impact of the COVID-19 pandemic in New Zealand highlighted a structural weakness in the small business sector. Russell had said:  Finance Minister Grant Robertson disagreed with her characterisation at the time, and ACT Party leader David Seymour subsequently suggested that these words were unsympathetic to small business. While many small business advisors and mentors agreed with Russell, she was criticised as being insensitive by left-wing commentator Chris Trotter, journalist Duncan Garner, and National Party MP Judith Collins.

Second term, 2020–present
During the 2020 New Zealand general election, Russell retained the New Lynn electorate by a final margin of 13,134 votes.

In early November, Russell was appointed as Parliamentary Under-Secretary to the Minister of Revenue. In a cabinet reshuffle by Prime Minister Chris Hipkins on 31 January 2023 Russell was appointed a minister for Statistics, Earthquake Commission, Associate Justice, Associate Revenue.

References

External links
 

1966 births
Living people
New Zealand Labour Party MPs
Members of the New Zealand House of Representatives
21st-century New Zealand women politicians
Women members of the New Zealand House of Representatives
Unsuccessful candidates in the 2014 New Zealand general election
New Zealand MPs for Auckland electorates
Candidates in the 2020 New Zealand general election
New Zealand feminists
Government ministers of New Zealand
Women government ministers of New Zealand